Martin Sweeney may refer to:

 Martin L. Sweeney (1885–1960), U.S. Representative from Ohio
 Martin J. Sweeney (born 1963), American politician from Ohio